Club Instituto Rosalía de Castro is a basketball team based in Santiago de Compostela, Galicia and plays in the Pavillón Instituto Rosalia de Castro, in Liga EBA.

History
The club was born in the Rosalía de Castro High School and it played professionally during several years in LEB Oro and LEB Plata. Since Obradoiro CAB returned to Liga ACB, the club resigned to play professionally and continues its basketball activity in Liga EBA, integrated in the Fedesa Foundation with women's basketball club CB Pío XII.

Season by season

Notable players
 David Doblas
 Sandi Čebular
 Corsley Edwards
 Brad Oleson

Trophies and awards

Trophies
LEB Plata: (1)
2007

External links
 Official website
History of the basketball club in the High School website (in Galician)
Federación Española de Baloncesto

Basketball teams in Galicia (Spain)
Basketball teams established in 1993
1993 establishments in Spain
Former LEB Oro teams
Sport in Santiago de Compostela